Papuma is an Eastern Malayo-Polynesian language spoken in Papua Province of Western New Guinea, northeastern Indonesia.

References

South Halmahera–West New Guinea languages
Languages of western New Guinea
Papua (province) culture